Jomboy District is a district of Samarqand Region in Uzbekistan. Its capital is Jomboy.

The district consists of one city (Jomboy), 5 urban-type settlements (Dehqonobod, Eski Jomboy, Xoʻja, Gʻazira, Kattaqishloq) and 8 rural communities.

History and culture 
In 1502, when Shaibani Khan was returning from Bukhara to Samarkand, he built a bridge of 7 arches on the Zarafshan river crossing from Jomboy. Over time, the arches were damaged, and in the 40s of the 19th century, 3 arches remained intact. Now. only one arch of the bridge has been preserved. In 1899, a railway was built through Jomboy.

Cultural life is somewhat developed in the district. People such as Ahmad Azam, Zoir Mirzayev (the current governor of the Tashkent Region), and Quddus Azam are from Jomboy.

There are 4 general education schools, a college of domestic service, a vocational lyceum, a scientific research institute of Acrology and Parasitology, 2 libraries, a house of culture, and a museum of local history. A symbolic gate has been installed at the entrance to the city.

Economy 

The district produces some quantity of cotton. There has also been evidence of basket-weaving among both men and women, though women have been handicapped by having to also perform a greater share of household chores.

References 

Samarqand Region
Districts of Uzbekistan